This is a list of sheriffs and high sheriffs of the English county of Rutland.

The sheriff is the oldest secular office under the Crown: there has been a Sheriff of Rutland since 1129. Formerly the sheriff was the principal law enforcement officer in the county but over the centuries most of the responsibilities associated with the post have been transferred elsewhere or are now defunct, so that its functions are now largely ceremonial. Under the provisions of the Local Government Act 1972, on 1 April 1974 the office previously known as sheriff was retitled high sheriff. The high sheriff changes every March.

After some 22 years as part of Leicestershire, Rutland was split away in 1996 as a unitary authority with its own shrievalty, thus establishing the separate High Sheriff of Rutland.

Sheriffs

1100–1200
1129: William de Albeni, the Breton
1155: Richard de Humez
1156: Thomas Ondeby
1157: Robert filius Goboldi
1159: Richard de Humez 
1161: Robert filius Goboldi
1163: Richard de Humez 
1165: Robert Goebold
1166: Richard de Humez
1179: William Malduit
1188: Amalric Dispensator (Despenser)
1189: William Malduit
1195: William de Albeni
1198: Benedict de Haveresham
1199: Hugh le Scot

1200–1300
1200–1205: Robert Malduit
1205–1211: Ralph Normanville
1211–1217: Robert of Braybrooke and Henry of Braybrooke
1215–1224: Falkes de Breauté
1218–1228: Alan Basset
1228–1254: Jeffery de Rokingham
1254–1259: Ralph de Greneham
1259–1272: Anketyn de Markinal
1272–1281: Peter Wakerville and William Bovile
1281–1289: Alberic de Whitleber
1289–1300: Edmund, 2nd Earl of Cornwall

1300–1400
1300–1301: John Burley
1302–1312: Margaret, widow of Edmund, 2nd Earl of Cornwall
1313–1316: Margaret, widow of Piers Gaveston
1316–1318: Hugh de Audley, 1st Baron Audley
1321: Ivo de Aldeburgh
1322–1327: Edmund of Woodstock, 1st Earl of Kent
1327–1347: Hugh de Audley, 1st Baron Audley (died in office 1347)
1349–1360: William de Bohun, 1st Earl of Northampton (died in office 1360)
1360–1365: William Wade
1365–1373: Humphrey de Bohun, 7th Earl of Hereford (died in office 1363)
1374–1376: John Wittleborough of Whissendine and Milton and Marholm, Northants
1376–1377: Simon Ward
1378: John Wittleborough of Whissendine and Milton and Marholm, Northants
1379: Sir Thomas de Burton, Kt.
1380: John Basings
1381: William Moorwood
1382: John Wittleborough of Whissendine and Milton and Marholm, Northants
1383: William Flore (or Flower)
1384: Walter Skarles of Uppingham
1385: Sir John de Calveley of Stapleford, Leics. and Teigh
1386–1387: Robert de Vere
1388: John Wittleborough of Whissendine and Milton and Marholm, Northants
1388: Walter Skarles of Uppingham
1389: Sir John de Calveley of Stapleford, Leics. and Teigh
1390–1397: Edward, Earl of Rutland
1397–1399: Thomas Onderley
1399: John Wittleborough of Whissendine and Milton and Marholm, Northants

1400–1500

1500–1600

1600–1700

1700–1800

1800–1899

1900–1973

High sheriff

References

The Rutland Magazine and County Historical Record, Vol 4, (Oakham: C Matkin, 1910), pp73–85
  The History of the Worthies of England volume 3

External links 
The High Sheriffs' Association of England and Wales (The Shrievalty Association)
High Sheriff of Rutland website

 
Rutland
Local government in Rutland
High Sheriff